Alf Schnéevoigt (25 December 1915 – 22 April 1982) was a Danish photographer born to George Schnéevoigt and Henriette Mathilde Frederiksen. At the beginning of World War II Schnéevoigt worked as a film photographer at ASA. He was subsequently with Frikorps Danmark on the eastern front and photographed for Die Deutsche Wochenschau.

Schnéevoigt was arrested on 6 May 1945 at his residence for the alleged murder of Jørgen Buntzen and Hipoen Herskov. On November 14, 1946, he was sentenced to death. He did not manage to be executed before 1947, where the sentence was changed to life in prison. After 10 years in prison he was released.

Filmography 

 Moster fra Mols (1943)
 Afsporet (1942)
 Frøken Vildkat (1942)
 Frøken Kirkemus (1941)
 Tag til Rønneby Kro (1941)
 Far skal giftes (1941)
 Tror du jeg er født i Gaar! (1941)
 En ganske almindelig Pige (1940)

References

External links 

Danish Nazis
Danish photographers
1915 births
1982 deaths
20th-century Danish criminals
Danish male criminals
Danish people convicted of murder